

Events

Pre-1600
 917 – Liu Yan declares himself emperor, establishing the Southern Han state in southern China, at his capital of Panyu.
1367 – Swa Saw Ke becomes king of Ava
1590 – Alexander Farnese's army forces Henry IV of France to lift the siege of Paris.

1601–1900
1622 – A hurricane overruns a Spanish fleet bound from Havana to Cadiz and sinks the galleon Atocha. Only five men are rescued, but 260 passengers and 200 million pesos are buried with the Atocha under 50 feet of water. 
1661 – Fall of Nicolas Fouquet: Louis XIV's Superintendent of Finances is arrested in Nantes by D'Artagnan, captain of the king's musketeers.
1666 – Great Fire of London ends: Ten thousand buildings, including Old St Paul's Cathedral, are destroyed, but only six people are known to have died.
1697 – War of the Grand Alliance : A French warship commanded by Captain Pierre Le Moyne d'Iberville defeated an English squadron at the Battle of Hudson's Bay.
1698 – In an effort to Westernize his nobility, Tsar Peter I of Russia imposes a tax on beards for all men except the clergy and peasantry.
1725 – Wedding of Louis XV and Maria Leszczyńska.
1774 – First Continental Congress assembles in Philadelphia.
1781 – Battle of the Chesapeake in the American Revolutionary War: The British Navy is repelled by the French Navy, contributing to the British surrender at Yorktown.
1791 – Olympe de Gouges writes the Declaration of the Rights of Woman and of the Female Citizen.
1793 – French Revolution: The French National Convention initiates the Reign of Terror. 
1798 – Conscription is made mandatory in France by the Jourdan law. 
1812 – War of 1812: The Siege of Fort Wayne begins when Chief Winamac's forces attack two soldiers returning from the fort's outhouses.
1816 – Louis XVIII has to dissolve the Chambre introuvable ("Unobtainable Chamber").
1836 – Sam Houston is elected as the first president of the Republic of Texas.
1839 – The United Kingdom declares war on the Qing dynasty of China.
1862 – American Civil War: The Army of Northern Virginia crosses the Potomac River at White's Ford in the Maryland Campaign.
1877 – American Indian Wars: Oglala Sioux chief Crazy Horse is bayoneted by a United States soldier after resisting confinement in a guardhouse at Fort Robinson in Nebraska.
1882 – The first United States Labor Day parade is held in New York City. 
1887 – A fire at the Theatre Royal, Exeter, kills 186.

1901–present
1905 – Russo-Japanese War: In New Hampshire, United States, the Treaty of Portsmouth, mediated by U.S. President Theodore Roosevelt, ends the war. 
1914 – World War I: First Battle of the Marne begins. Northeast of Paris, the French attack and defeat German forces who are advancing on the capital. 
1915 – The pacifist Zimmerwald Conference begins.
1932 – The French Upper Volta is broken apart between Ivory Coast, French Sudan, and Niger.
1937 – Spanish Civil War: Llanes falls to the Nationalists following a one-day siege.
1938 – Chile: A group of youths affiliated with the fascist National Socialist Movement of Chile are executed after surrendering during a failed coup.
1941 – Whole territory of Estonia is occupied by Nazi Germany.
1942 – World War II: Japanese high command orders withdrawal at Milne Bay, the first major Japanese defeat in land warfare during the Pacific War.
1943 – World War II: The 503rd Parachute Infantry Regiment lands and occupies Lae Nadzab Airport, near Lae in the Salamaua–Lae campaign. 
1944 – Belgium, Netherlands and Luxembourg constitute Benelux.
1945 – Cold War: Igor Gouzenko, a Soviet Union embassy clerk, defects to Canada, exposing Soviet espionage in North America, signalling the beginning of the Cold War.
  1945   – Iva Toguri D'Aquino, a Japanese American suspected of being wartime radio propagandist Tokyo Rose, is arrested in Yokohama.
1948 – In France, Robert Schuman becomes President of the Council while being Foreign minister; as such, he is the negotiator of the major treaties of the end of World War II.
1954 – KLM Flight 633 crashes into the River Shannon in Shannon, County Clare, Ireland, killing 28.
1957 – Cuban Revolution: Fulgencio Batista bombs the revolt in Cienfuegos.
1960 – Poet Léopold Sédar Senghor is the first elected President of Senegal.
  1960   – Muhammad Ali (then known as Cassius Clay) wins the gold medal in the light heavyweight boxing competition at the Olympic Games in Rome.
1969 – Mỹ Lai Massacre: U.S. Army Lieutenant William Calley is charged with six specifications of premeditated murder for the death of 109 Vietnamese civilians in My Lai. 
1970 – Vietnam War: Operation Jefferson Glenn begins: The United States 101st Airborne Division and the South Vietnamese 1st Infantry Division initiate a new operation in Thừa Thiên–Huế Province.
  1970   – Jochen Rindt becomes the only driver to posthumously win the Formula One World Drivers' Championship (in ), after being killed in practice for the Italian Grand Prix.
1972 – Munich massacre: A Palestinian terrorist group called "Black September" attacks and takes hostage 11 Israeli athletes at the Munich Olympic Games. Two die in the attack and nine are murdered the following day.
1975 – Sacramento, California: Lynette Fromme attempts to assassinate U.S. President Gerald Ford.
1977 – Voyager Program: NASA launches the Voyager 1 spacecraft. 
1978 – Camp David Accords: Menachem Begin and Anwar Sadat begin peace discussions at Camp David, Maryland. 
1980 – The Gotthard Road Tunnel opens in Switzerland as the world's longest highway tunnel at  stretching from Göschenen to Airolo.
1981 – The first women arrive at what becomes Greenham Common Women's Peace Camp in the UK.
1984 – STS-41-D: The Space Shuttle Discovery lands after its maiden voyage.
  1984   – Western Australia becomes the last Australian state to abolish capital punishment.
1986 – Pan Am Flight 73 from Mumbai, India with 358 people on board is hijacked at Karachi International Airport.
1990 – Sri Lankan Civil War: Sri Lankan Army soldiers slaughter 158 civilians.
1991 – The current international treaty defending indigenous peoples, Indigenous and Tribal Peoples Convention, 1989, comes into force.
1996 – Hurricane Fran makes landfall near Cape Fear, North Carolina as a Category 3 storm with 115 mph sustained winds. Fran caused over $3 billion in damage and killed 27 people.
2012 – An accidental explosion at a Turkish Army ammunition store in Afyon, western Turkey kills 25 soldiers and wounds four others.
2021 – The President of Guinea, Alpha Condé is captured by armed forces during a coup d'état.
2022 – Liz Truss is declared the winner of the UK Conservative Party leadership election, beating Rishi Sunak
2022 – At least 93 people die and 25 are missing after a magnitude 6.8 earthquake strikes Sichuan, China.

Births

Pre-1600
 989 – Fan Zhongyan, Chinese chancellor (d. 1052)
1187 – Louis VIII, king of France (d. 1226)
1201 – Alix of Thouars, duchess of Brittany (d. 1221)
1319 – Peter IV, king of Aragon (d. 1387)
1451 – Isabel Neville, daughter of Richard Neville (d. 1476)
1500 – Maria of Jever, ruler of the Lordship of Jever (d. 1575)
1533 – Jacopo Zabarella, Italian philosopher and logician (d. 1589)
1540 – Magnus of Holstein, prince of Denmark  (d. 1583)
1567 – Date Masamune, Japanese daimyō (d. 1636)
1568 – Tommaso Campanella, Italian poet, philosopher, and theologian (d. 1639)

1601–1900
1638 – Louis XIV, king of France (d. 1715)
1641 – Robert Spencer, 2nd Earl of Sunderland, English diplomat (d. 1702)
1642 – Maria of Orange-Nassau, Dutch princess (d. 1688)
1651 – William Dampier, English explorer (d. 1715)
1666 – Gottfried Arnold, German historian and theologian (d. 1714)
1667 – Giovanni Girolamo Saccheri, Italian priest, mathematician, and philosopher (d. 1733)
1694 – František Václav Míča, Czech conductor and composer (d. 1744)
1695 – Carl Gustaf Tessin, Swedish politician and diplomat (d. 1770)
1722 – Frederick Christian, Prince-Elector of Saxony (d. 1763)
1725 – Jean-Étienne Montucla, French mathematician and theorist (d. 1799)
1735 – Johann Christian Bach, German-English viol player and composer (d. 1782)
1750 – Robert Fergusson, Scottish poet and author (d. 1774)
1769 – John Shortland, English commander (d. 1810)
1771 – Archduke Charles, Duke of Teschen (d. 1847)
1772 – Fath-Ali Shah Qajar, Iranian king (d. 1834)
1774 – Caspar David Friedrich, German painter and etcher (d. 1840)
1775 – Juan Martín Díez, Spanish general (d. 1825)
1781 – Anton Diabelli, Austrian composer and publisher (d. 1858)
1787 – François Sulpice Beudant, French mineralogist and geologist (d. 1850)
1791 – Giacomo Meyerbeer, German pianist and composer (d. 1864)
1792 – Ours-Pierre-Armand Petit-Dufrénoy, French geologist and mineralogist (d. 1857)
1806 – Christophe Léon Louis Juchault de Lamoricière, French general and politician, French Minister of War (d. 1865)
1817 – Aleksey Konstantinovich Tolstoy, Russian poet, author, and playwright (d. 1875)
1818 – Edmund Kennedy, Australian explorer and surveyor (d. 1848)
1826 – John Wisden, English cricketer and businessman (d. 1884)
1827 – Goffredo Mameli, Italian poet and songwriter (d. 1849)
1829 – Lester Allan Pelton, American inventor (d. 1908)
1831 – Victorien Sardou, French author and playwright (d. 1908)
1833 – George Huntington Hartford, American businessman (d. 1917) 
1836 – Justiniano Borgoño, Peruvian soldier and politician, 57th President of Peru (d. 1921)
1847 – Jesse James, American outlaw (d. 1882)
1850 – Eugen Goldstein, German physicist (d. 1930)
1856 – Thomas E. Watson, American lawyer, publisher, and politician (d. 1922)
1867 – Amy Beach, American pianist and composer (d. 1944)
1871 – Friedrich Akel, Estonian physician and politician, Head of State of Estonia (d 1941)
1872 – V. O. Chidambaram Pillai, Indian lawyer and politician (d. 1936)
1872 – Horace Rice, Australian tennis player (d. 1950)
1873 – Cornelius Vanderbilt III, American general and engineer (d. 1942)
1874 – Nap Lajoie, American baseball player and manager (d. 1959)
1876 – Wilhelm Ritter von Leeb, German field marshal (d. 1956)
1880 – José María of Manila, Spanish-Filipino priest and martyr (d. 1936)
1881 – Otto Bauer, Austrian philosopher and politician, Foreign Minister of Austria (d. 1938)
  1881   – Henry Maitland Wilson, 1st Baron Wilson, English field marshal (d. 1964)
1883 – Otto Erich Deutsch, Austrian musicologist and scholar (d. 1967)
1888 – Sarvepalli Radhakrishnan, Indian philosopher and politician, 2nd President of India (d. 1975)
1892 – Joseph Szigeti, Hungarian violinist and educator (d. 1973)
1897 – Morris Carnovsky, American actor (d. 1992)
  1897   – Arthur Nielsen, American market analyst, founded ACNielsen (d. 1980)
1899 – Humphrey Cobb, American author and screenwriter (d. 1944)
  1899   – Helen Creighton, Canadian author and educator (d. 1989)

1901–present
1901 – Florence Eldridge, American actress (d. 1988)
  1901   – Mario Scelba, Italian politician, 33rd Prime Minister of Italy (d. 1991)
1902 – Jean Dalrymple, American playwright, producer, manager, and publicist (d. 1998)
  1902   – Darryl F. Zanuck, American actor, director, producer, and screenwriter (d. 1979)
1904 – Vera Bradford, Australian pianist and educator (d. 2004)
1905 – Maurice Challe, French general (d. 1979)
  1905   – Arthur Koestler, Hungarian-English journalist and author (d. 1983)
  1905   – Justiniano Montano, Filipino lawyer and politician (d. 2005)
1906 – Ralston Crawford, American painter, lithographer, and photographer (d. 1978)
  1906   – Sunnyland Slim, American singer-songwriter and pianist (d. 1995)
1908 – Josué de Castro, Brazilian physician, geographer, and activist (d. 1973)
  1908   – Joaquín Nin-Culmell, German-American pianist and composer (d. 2004)
  1908   – Cecilia Seghizzi, Italian composer and painter (d. 2019)
1909 – Hans Carste, German pianist and conductor (d. 1971)
  1909   – Bernard Delfont, Russian-English talent manager (d. 1994)
  1909   – Archie Jackson, Scottish-Australian cricketer (d. 1933)
1910 – Leila Mackinlay, English author (d. 1996)
  1910   – Phiroze Palia, Indian cricketer (d. 1981)
1912 – John Cage, American composer and theorist (d. 1992)
  1912   – Kristina Söderbaum, Swedish-German actress and photographer (d. 2001)
  1912   – Frank Thomas, American voice actor, animator, and screenwriter (d. 2004)
1914 – Stuart Freeborn, English make up artist (d. 2013)
  1914   – Gail Kubik, American violinist, composer, and educator (d. 1984)
  1914   – Nicanor Parra, Chilean physicist, mathematician, and poet (d. 2018)
1916 – Frank Shuster, Canadian comedian, actor, and screenwriter (d. 2002)
  1916   – Frank Yerby, American novelist (d. 1991)
1917 – Pedro E. Guerrero, American photographer (d. 2012)
  1917   – Sören Nordin, Swedish harness racer and trainer (d. 2008)
1918 – Luis Alcoriza, Mexican actor, director, and screenwriter (d. 1992)
  1918   – Bob Katter, Sr., Australian captain and politician (d. 1990)
  1918   – Fred McCarthy, American cartoonist and monk (d. 2009)
1919 – Elisabeth Volkenrath, German SS officer (d. 1945)
1920 – Peter Racine Fricker, English-American composer and educator (d. 1990)
  1920   – Fons Rademakers, Dutch-Swiss actor, director, producer, and screenwriter (d. 2007)
1921 – Murray Henderson, Canadian ice hockey player and coach (d. 2013)
  1921   – Jack Valenti, American businessman, created the MPAA film rating system (d. 2007)
1922 – Denys Wilkinson, English physicist and academic (d. 2016)
1923 – David Hamer, Australian captain and politician (d. 2002)
  1923   – Ken Meuleman, Australian cricketer (d. 2004)
1924 – Paul Dietzel, American football player and coach (d. 2013)
  1924   – Frank Armitage, Australian-American artist (d. 2016)
1925 – Justin Kaplan, American author (d. 2014)
1927 – Paul Volcker, American economist and academic (d. 2019)
1928 – Joyce Hatto, English pianist and educator (d. 2006)
  1928   – Albert Mangelsdorff, German trombonist and educator (d. 2005)
1929 – Bob Newhart, American comedian and actor 
  1929   – Andriyan Nikolayev, Russian general, pilot, and cosmonaut (d. 2004)
1932 – Carol Lawrence, American actress and singer
  1932   – Robert H. Dennard, American electrical engineer and inventor
1933 – Francisco Javier Errázuriz Ossa, Chilean cardinal
1934 – Paul Josef Cordes, German cardinal
  1934   – Dennis Letts, American actor and educator (d. 2008)
  1934   – Kevin McNamara, English politician, Shadow Secretary of State for Northern Ireland (d. 2017)
1935 – Werner Erhard, American author and philanthropist, founded Werner Erhard and Associates and The Hunger Project
  1935   – Helen Gifford, Australian composer and educator
1936 – Robert Burns, Canadian lawyer and politician (d. 2014)
  1936   – John Danforth, American politician and diplomat, 24th United States Ambassador to the United Nations
  1936   – Jonathan Kozol, American sociologist, author, and educator
  1936   – Bill Mazeroski, American baseball player and coach
  1936   – Knuts Skujenieks, Latvian poet, journalist, and translator 
1937 – Antonio Valentín Angelillo, Argentinian footballer and manager (d. 2018)
  1937   – Dick Clement, English director, producer, and screenwriter
1938 – John Ferguson, Sr., Canadian ice hockey player, coach, and manager (d. 2007)
  1938   – Doreen Massey, Baroness Massey of Darwen, English politician
1939 – Claudette Colvin, American nurse and activist 
  1939   – William Devane, American actor, director, and screenwriter
  1939   – George Lazenby, Australian actor
  1939   – John Stewart, American singer-songwriter and guitarist (d. 2008)
  1939   – George Tremlett, English journalist, author, and politician
1940 – Valerie Howarth, Baroness Howarth of Breckland, English politician
  1940   – Raquel Welch, American actress and singer (d. 2023)
1941 – Dave Dryden, Canadian ice hockey player and coach (d. 2022)
1942 – Werner Herzog, German actor, director, producer, and screenwriter
  1942   – Eduardo Mata, Mexican conductor and composer (d. 1995)
1943 – Dulce Saguisag, Filipino social worker and politician, 10th Filipino Secretary of Social Welfare and Development (d. 2007)
1944 – Dario Bellezza, Italian poet, author, and playwright (d. 1996)
  1944   – Gareth Evans, Australian lawyer and politician, 33rd Australian Minister of Foreign Affairs 
1945 – Eva Bergman, Swedish director and screenwriter
  1945   – Al Stewart, Scottish singer-songwriter and guitarist
1946 – Kyongae Chang, South Korean astrophysicist and academic
  1946   – Dennis Dugan, American actor and director
  1946   – Dean Ford, Scottish singer-songwriter and guitarist (Marmalade) (d. 2018)
  1946   – Freddie Mercury, Zanzibari-English singer-songwriter and producer (d. 1991)
  1946   – Loudon Wainwright III, American singer-songwriter, guitarist, and actor
1947 – Mel Collins, Manx saxophonist and flute player 
  1947   – Chip Davis, American pianist, songwriter, and producer 
  1947   – Buddy Miles, American singer-songwriter and drummer (d. 2008)
  1947   – Bruce Yardley, Australian cricketer and sportscaster (d. 2019)
1948 – Benita Ferrero-Waldner, Austrian lawyer, politician, and diplomat, Foreign Minister of Austria
1949 – Clem Clempson, English guitarist and songwriter 
1950 – Rosie Cooper, English businesswoman and politician
  1950   – Cathy Guisewite, American cartoonist, created Cathy
1951 – Paul Breitner, German footballer
  1951   – Michael Keaton, American actor and producer
  1951   – Jamie Oldaker, American drummer and percussionist (d. 2020)
1952 – David Glen Eisley, American rock singer-songwriter and actor
1953 – Victor Davis Hanson, American historian and journalist
  1953   – Murray Mexted, New Zealand rugby player and sportscaster
  1953   – Eiki Nestor, Estonian engineer and politician, Estonian Minister of Social Affairs
  1953   – Paul Piché, Canadian singer-songwriter
1954 – Richard Austin, Jamaican footballer and cricketer (d. 2015)
  1954   – Frederick Kempe, American journalist and author
1956 – Low Thia Khiang, Singaporean businessman and politician
  1956   – Roine Stolt, Swedish singer-songwriter, guitarist, and producer
1957 – Rudi Gores, German footballer and manager
  1957   – Peter Winnen, Dutch cyclist 
1958 – Lars Danielsson, Swedish bassist, composer, and producer
1959 – Frank Schirrmacher, German journalist and publisher (d. 2014)
1960 – Don Kulick, Swedish anthropologist and academic
1961 – Marc-André Hamelin, Canadian pianist and composer
1962 – Tracy Edwards, English sailor and coach
  1962   – John McGrath, Welsh businessman
1963 – Juan Alderete, American bass player and songwriter 
  1963   – Jeff Brantley, American baseball player and sportscaster
  1963   – Terry Ellis, American R&B singer–songwriter and actress
  1963   – Taki Inoue, Japanese race car driver and manager
1964 – Frank Farina, Australian footballer and manager
  1964   – Sergei Loznitsa, Belarusian-Ukrainian director and screenwriter
  1964   – Ken Norman, American basketball player
  1964   – Thomas Mikal Ford, American actor (d. 2016)
1965 – David Brabham, Australian race car driver
  1965   – Hoshitango Imachi, Japanese wrestler
  1965   – Nick Talbot, English geneticist and academic
1966 – Achero Mañas, Spanish actor, director, and screenwriter
  1966   – Milinko Pantić, Serbian footballer and manager
1967 – Matthias Sammer, German footballer and manager
  1967   – Jane Sixsmith, English field hockey player
1968 – Serhiy Kovalets, Ukrainian footballer and manager
  1968   – Dennis Scott, American basketball player and sportscaster
  1968   – Robin van der Laan, Dutch footballer and coach
  1968   – Brad Wilk, American singer-songwriter and drummer 
1969 – Leonardo Araújo, Brazilian footballer and manager
  1969   – Mariko Kouda, Japanese voice actress, singer, and radio host
  1969   – Mark Ramprakash, English cricketer and coach
  1969   – Dweezil Zappa, American actor and musician
1970 – Liam Lynch, American singer-songwriter, guitarist, puppeteer, and director 
  1970   – Mohammad Rafique, Bangladeshi cricketer
  1970   – Gilbert Remulla, Filipino journalist and politician
  1970   – Johnny Vegas, English actor, director, producer, and screenwriter
1971 – Adam Hollioake, Australian cricketer and mixed martial artist
1972 – Shane Sewell, Canadian-American wrestler and referee
  1972   – Guy Whittall, Zimbabwean cricketer
1973 – Paddy Considine, English actor, director, and screenwriter
  1973   – Rose McGowan, American actress
1974 – Lauren Jeska, British transgender fell runner convicted of the attempted murder of Ralph Knibbs
  1974   – Rawl Lewis, Grenadian cricketer
  1974   – Ken-Marti Vaher, Estonian politician, Estonian Minister of the Interior
1975 – Rod Barajas, American baseball player and manager
  1975   – George Boateng, Dutch footballer and manager
  1975   – Randy Choate, American baseball player
  1975   – Matt Geyer, Australian rugby league player and coach
1976 – Tatiana Gutsu, Ukrainian gymnast
1977 – Rosevelt Colvin, American football player and sportscaster
  1977   – Joseba Etxeberria, Spanish footballer
  1977   – Minoru Fujita, Japanese wrestler
  1977   – Nazr Mohammed, American basketball player
1978 – Laura Bertram, Canadian actress
  1978   – Chris Jack, New Zealand rugby player 
  1978   – Sylvester Joseph, Antiguan cricketer
  1978   – Zhang Zhong, Chinese chess player
1979 – John Carew, Norwegian footballer
  1979   – Stacey Dales, Canadian basketball player and sportscaster
  1979   – Julien Lizeroux, French skier
  1979   – Salvatore Mastronunzio, Italian footballer
  1979   – George O'Callaghan, Irish footballer
1980 – Franco Costanzo, Argentinian footballer
  1980   – Kevin Simm, British singer
1981 – Daniel Moreno, Spanish cyclist
  1981   – Kai Rüütel, Estonian opera singer 
  1981   – Filippo Volandri, Italian tennis player
1982 – Alexandre Geijo, Spanish-Swiss footballer
1983 – Eugen Bopp, Ukrainian-German footballer
  1983   – Pablo Granoche, Uruguayan footballer
  1983   – Lincoln Riley, American football coach
  1983   – Antony Sweeney, English footballer
1984 – Alison Bell, Scottish field hockey player
  1984   – Chris Anker Sørensen, Danish cyclist (d. 2021)
1985 – Justin Dentmon, American basketball player
  1985   – Ryan Guy, American soccer player
1986 – Colt McCoy, American football player
  1986   – Pragyan Ojha, Indian cricketer
1988 – Denni Avdić, Swedish footballer
  1988   – Felipe Caicedo, Ecuadorian footballer
1989 – Elena Delle Donne, American basketball player
  1989   – José Ángel Valdés, Spanish footballer
  1989   – Ben Youngs, English rugby player
1990 – Antonio Esposito, Italian footballer
  1990   – Francesca Segarelli, Dominican tennis player
  1990   – Lance Stephenson, American basketball player
  1990   – Yuna Kim, South Korean figure skater
  1990   – Franco Zuculini, Argentinian footballer
1991 – Zeki Yavru, Turkish footballer
1993 – T. J. Warren, American basketball player
1994 – Gregorio Paltrinieri, Italian swimmer
1995 – Szabina Szlavikovics, Hungarian tennis player
1996 – Richairo Zivkovic, Dutch footballer 
  1996   – Sigrid, Norwegian singer
1997 – Kyōko Saitō, Japanese idol
1998 – Caroline Dolehide, American tennis player
  1998   – Davion Mitchell, American basketball player
2001 – Bukayo Saka, English footballer

Deaths

Pre-1600
 590 – Authari, Lombard king (b. 540)
 714 – Shang, emperor of the Tang Dynasty
1165 – Nijō, emperor of Japan (b. 1143)
1235 – Henry I, duke of Brabant (b. 1165)
1311 – Amadeus Aba, Hungarian oligarch
1336 – Charles d'Évreux, count of Étampes (b. 1305)
1526 – Alonso de Salazar, Spanish explorer
1548 – Catherine Parr, Sixth and last Queen of Henry VIII of England (b. c. 1512)
1562 – Katharina Zell, German Protestant reformer (b. 1497)
1569 – Edmund Bonner, Bishop of London (b. c. 1500)

1601–1900
1607 – Pomponne de Bellièvre, French politician, Chancellor of France (b. 1529)
1629 – Domenico Allegri, Italian singer-songwriter (b. 1585)
1734 – Nicolas Bernier, French composer (b. 1664)
1786 – Jonas Hanway, English merchant and philanthropist (b. 1712)
1803 – Pierre Choderlos de Laclos, French general and author (b. 1741)
1803 – François Devienne, French flute player and composer (b. 1759)
1836 – Ferdinand Raimund, Austrian actor and playwright (b. 1790)
1838 – Charles Percier, French architect and interior decorator (b. 1764)
1857 – Auguste Comte, French sociologist and philosopher (b. 1798)
1876 – Manuel Blanco Encalada, Chilean admiral and politician, 1st President of Chile (b. 1790)
1877 – Crazy Horse, American tribal leader (b. 1849)
1894 – George Stoneman, Jr., United States Army cavalry officer (b. 1822)
1898 – Sarah Emma Edmonds, Canadian-American nurse, soldier, and spy (b. 1841)

1901–present
1901 – Ignacij Klemenčič, Slovenian physicist and academic (b. 1853)
1902 – Rudolf Virchow, German anthropologist, pathologist, and biologist (b. 1821)
1906 – Ludwig Boltzmann, Austrian physicist and philosopher (b. 1844)
1909 – Louis Bouveault, French chemist (b. 1864)
1912 – Arthur MacArthur, Jr., American LTG (Army), Medal of Honor recipient (b. 1845)
1917 – Marian Smoluchowski, Austrian-Polish physicist and mountaineer (b. 1872)
1920 – Robert Harron, American actor (b. 1893)
1922 – Georgette Agutte, French painter (b. 1867)
1926 – Karl Harrer, German journalist and politician (b. 1890)
1930 – Robert Means Thompson, American soldier, businessman, and philanthropist (b. 1849)
1931 – John Thomson, Scottish footballer (b. 1909)
1932 – Francisco Acebal, Spanish journalist, author, and playwright (b. 1866)
  1932   – Paul Bern, German-American director, producer, and screenwriter (b. 1889)
1934 – Sidney Myer, Russian-Australian businessman, founded Myer Stores (b. 1878)
1936 – Gustave Kahn, French poet and critic (b. 1859)
1942 – François de Labouchère, French soldier and pilot (b. 1917)
1945 – Clem Hill, Australian cricketer and footballer (b. 1877)
1948 – Richard C. Tolman, American physicist and chemist (b. 1881)
1953 – Richard Walther Darré, Argentinian-German agronomist and politician (b. 1895)
1954 – Eugen Schiffer, German lawyer and politician, Vice-Chancellor of Germany (b. 1860)
1955 – Haydn Bunton, Sr., Australian footballer and coach (b. 1911)
1965 – Thomas Johnston, Scottish journalist and politician, Secretary of State for Scotland (b. 1882)
1966 – Dezső Lauber, Hungarian golfer, tennis player, and architect (b. 1879)
1970 – Jochen Rindt, German-Austrian race car driver (b. 1942)
1972 – Alan Kippax, Australian cricketer and businessman (b. 1897)
1973 – Jack Fournier, American baseball player and coach (b. 1889)
1975 – Alice Catherine Evans, American microbiologist (b. 1881)
1977 – Marcel Thiry, Belgian poet and activist (b. 1897)
1979 – Alberto di Jorio, Italian cardinal (b. 1884)
1980 – Don Banks, Australian composer and educator (b. 1923)
1982 – Douglas Bader, English captain and pilot (b. 1910)
1984 – Adam Malik, Indonesian politician and diplomat, 3rd Vice President of Indonesia (b. 1917)
  1984   – Jane Roberts, American psychic and author (b. 1929)
1985 – Johannes Hint, Estonian engineer (b. 1914)
1986 – Neerja Bhanot, Indian model and youngest recipient of country's highest peacetime military award Ashok Chakra (b. 1963)
1988 – Gert Fröbe, German actor and singer (b. 1913)
1989 – Philip Baxter, Welsh-Australian chemical engineer (b. 1905)
1990 – Hugh Foot, Baron Caradon, English academic and diplomat (b. 1907)
  1990   – Jerry Iger, American cartoonist and publisher, co-founded Eisner & Iger (b. 1903)
  1990   – Ivan Mihailov, Bulgarian politician (b. 1896)
1991 – Sharad Joshi, Indian author and poet (b. 1931)
1992 – Fritz Leiber, American author and poet (b. 1910)
1993 – Claude Renoir, French cinematographer (b. 1914)
1994 – Shimshon Amitsur, Israeli mathematician and scholar (b. 1921)
  1994   – John Newman, Australian politician (b. 1946)
1995 – Benyamin Sueb, Indonesian comedian, actor, and singer (b. 1939)
  1995   – Salil Chowdhury, Indian music composer, who mainly composed for Bengali, Hindi, Malayalam film and other films. (b. 1922)
1996 – Basil Salvadore D'Souza, Indian bishop (b. 1926)
1997 – Leon Edel, American author and critic (b. 1907)
  1997   – Eddie Little Sky, American actor (b. 1926)
  1997   – Georg Solti, Hungarian conductor and director (b. 1912)
  1997   – Mother Teresa, Albanian-Indian nun, missionary, and saint, Nobel Prize laureate (b. 1910)
1998 – Ferdinand Biondi, Canadian radio host (b. 1909)
  1998   – Willem Drees, Jr., Dutch economist and politician, Dutch Minister of Transport (b. 1922)
  1998   – Verner Panton, Danish interior designer (b. 1926)
  1998   – Leo Penn, American actor and director (b. 1921)
1999 – Alan Clark, English historian and politician, Minister for Defence Procurement (b. 1928)
  1999   – Allen Funt, American director, producer, and screenwriter (b. 1914)
  1999   – Bryce Mackasey, Canadian businessman and politician, Postmaster General of Canada (b. 1921)
2000 – Roy Fredericks, Guyanese cricketer and politician (b. 1942)
2001 – Justin Wilson, American chef and author (b. 1914)
  2001   – Vladimir Žerjavić, Croatian economist and academic (b. 1912)
2002 – David Todd Wilkinson, American cosmologist and astronomer (b. 1935)
2003 – Gisele MacKenzie, Canadian-American singer and actress (b. 1927)
2005 – Roberto Viaux, Chilean general (b. 1917)
2007 – Jennifer Dunn, American engineer and politician (b. 1941)
  2007   – Paul Gillmor, American lawyer and politician (b. 1939)
  2007   – Thomas Hansen, Norwegian singer-songwriter and guitarist (b. 1976)
  2007   – D. James Kennedy, American pastor and author (b. 1930)
  2007   – Nikos Nikolaidis, Greek director and screenwriter (b. 1939)
2009 – Gani Fawehinmi, Nigerian lawyer and activist (b. 1938)
2010 – Hedley Beare, Australian author and academic (b. 1932)
  2010   – Guillaume Cornelis van Beverloo, Belgian-Dutch poet and painter (b. 1922)
2012 – Ediz Bahtiyaroğlu, Turkish-Bosnian footballer (b. 1986)
  2012   – Ian Dick, Australian cricketer and field hockey player (b. 1926)
  2012   – Victoria Fyodorova, Russian-American actress and author (b. 1946)
  2012   – John Oaksey, English jockey and journalist (b. 1929)
2013 – Edwin Bideau, American lawyer and politician (b. 1950)
  2013   – Geoffrey Goodman, English pilot, journalist, and author (b. 1922)
  2013   – Isamu Jordan, American journalist and academic (b. 1975)
2014 – Bruce Morton, American journalist (b. 1930)
  2014   – Mara Neusel, German mathematician, author, and academic (b. 1964)
2015 – Goh Eng Wah, Malaysian-Singaporean businessman, founded Eng Wah Global (b. 1923)
  2015   – Aadesh Shrivastava, Indian singer-songwriter (b. 1964)
  2015   – Chester Stranczek, American baseball player and businessman (b. 1929)
2016 – Hugh O'Brian, American actor (b. 1925)
  2016   – Phyllis Schlafly, American lawyer, writer, and political activist (b. 1924)
2018 – Bhagwatikumar Sharma, Indian Gujarati writer and journalist (b. 1934)
  2018   – Beatriz Segall, Brazilian actress (b. 1926)
2019 – Francisco Toledo, Mexican painter, sculptor, and graphic artist (b. 1940)
2021 – Sarah Harding, English singer, member of Girls Aloud (b. 1981)

Holidays and observances
Christian feast day:
Bertin
Charbel (martyr)
Genebald
Gregorio Aglipay (Episcopal Church)
Mother Teresa
Ursicinus of Ravenna
Zechariah and Elisabeth (Anglican and Eastern Orthodox Church)
September 5 (Eastern Orthodox liturgics)
Earliest date on which Jeûne genevois can fall, while September 11 is the latest; celebrated on Thursday after the first Sunday of September. (Canton of Geneva) 
International Day of Charity
Teacher's Day (India)
The flag-flying day for Denmark's deployed personnel (Denmark)
First day of school in Vietnam

References

External links

 
 
 

Days of the year
September